The Women's 50m Butterfly event at the 10th FINA World Aquatics Championships swam on July 25 – 26, 2003 in Barcelona, Spain. Preliminary and Semifinal heats swam on July 25, with the Final swum on July 26.

At the start of the event, the World (WR) and Championship (CR) records were:
WR: 25.57 swum by Anna-Karin Kammerling (Sweden) on July 30, 2002 in Berlin, Germany.
CR: 25.90 swum by Inge de Bruijn (Netherlands) on July 26, 2001 in Fukuoka, Japan

Results

Final

Semifinals

Preliminaries

References

Swimming at the 2003 World Aquatics Championships
2003 in women's swimming